The Second Leiter Building, also known as the Leiter II Building, the Sears Building, One Congress Center, and Robert Morris Center, is located at the southeast corner of South State Street and East Ida B. Wells Drive in Chicago, Illinois. The building is not to be confused with the present Willis Tower, formerly the  Sears Tower, constructed and owned by the famous nationwide mail-order firm Sears, Roebuck & Company. This landmark of the Chicago school of architecture gained fame for being one of the earliest commercial buildings constructed with a metal skeleton frame remaining in the United States.

Built in 1891 by Levi Z. Leiter, (1834–1904), the Second Leiter Building was designed by architect William Le Baron Jenney, who implemented the skeletal frame made of steel to make the design fireproof. The building was leased by Levi Leiter to the department store of Siegel, Cooper and Company who occupied it for approximately seven years. After Siegel Cooper closed, the building hosted various tenants until it became the downtown flagship store of Sears, Roebuck and Company in 1931.  Sears occupied the space the until 1986 when it decided to close the store and the space was leased to other tenants.

The structure is eight floors and occupies the entire block of State Street between Ida B. Wells Drive and Van Buren Street. The State Street facade consists of nine bays separated by wide pilasters. The pilasters are capped by simple capitals and an unadorned cornice crowns the entire structure. Within each bay are four windows on each floor aligned vertically. The building is faced with a pink granite. Each floor contains  with  ceilings and could be divided to house multiple tenants.

Its predecessor, the First Leiter Building, was designed by Jenney in 1879 and stood at Wells and Monroe until it was demolished in 1972. The Second Leiter Building was designated a National Historic Landmark in 1976, and a Chicago Landmark on January 14, 1997. In 1998, the building became home to the Chicago campus of Robert Morris University.

See also

 Architecture of Chicago
 List of National Historic Landmarks in Illinois

References
Notes

Bibliography
 Miller, Donald L. City of the Century. Simon & Schuster, 1996. .

External links
 Leiter II Building Historic American Buildings Survey
 Leiter II Building National Historic Landmark designation on January 7, 1976

Chicago school architecture in Illinois
Commercial buildings completed in 1891
Commercial buildings on the National Register of Historic Places in Chicago
Department stores on the National Register of Historic Places
National Historic Landmarks in Chicago
Retail buildings in Illinois
Sears Holdings buildings and structures
1889 establishments in Illinois
Chicago Landmarks